Simsia lagasceiformis, the annual bush sunflower, is a species of flowering plant in the family Asteraceae. It is native to seasonally dry tropical areas of Arizona, New Mexico, Texas, Mexico, and Guatemala, and it has been introduced to Maryland.

References

Heliantheae
Flora of Arizona
Flora of the South-Central United States
Flora of Mexico
Flora of Guatemala
Plants described in 1836